Concepción is a town and municipality in the Colombian department of Antioquia. Part of the subregion of Eastern Antioquia is located at 75km from Medellin.

The village was declared "Site of Cultural and National Interest" in 1999, for its stone streets and its exceptional state of conservation.

Sites of Interest 
This small town preserves very beautiful colonial sites such as the main Church, the "Casa de la Cultura", where the independency's leader Jose Maria Cordova was born, and several colonial streets, among them Tulio Ospina, Eloy Alfaro, Santander and Cordova. All around many naturalistic sites: Matasano's falls, Aguacate's natural pool and amazing pier inside social Athakai farm.

Climate
Concepción has a cool tropical rainforest climate (Af) due to altitude. It has very heavy rainfall year-round.

References

Municipalities of Antioquia Department